The 2011–12 Australian Women's Twenty20 Cup was the third formal season of the Australian Women's Twenty20 Cup, which was the premier domestic women's Twenty20 cricket competition in Australia prior to the inception of the Women's Big Bash League in 2015. The tournament started on 21 October 2011 and finished on 12 January 2012. Defending champions Victorian Spirit won the tournament for the third time after finishing second in the group stage and beating New South Wales Breakers in the final. This marked the Breakers' third final loss in as many tournaments, each time after topping the ladder.

Ladder

Fixtures

Final

Statistics

Highest totals

Most runs

Most wickets

References

External links
 Series home at ESPNcricinfo

 
Australian Women's Twenty20 Cup seasons
 
Australian Women's Twenty20 Cup